A women's Twenty20 International (WT20I) is an international cricket match between two teams, each having WT20I status, as determined by the International Cricket Council (ICC), the sport's world governing body. In a women's Twenty20 match, the two teams play a single innings, each of which is restricted to a maximum of 20 overs. The Twenty20 format was originally introduced by the England and Wales Cricket Board for the men's county cricket competition with the first matches contested on 13 June 2003 between the English counties in the Twenty20 Cup. The first women's Twenty20 International match took place on 5 August 2004 when New Zealand defeated England by nine runs at the County Cricket Ground in Hove. This match was held six months before the first men's Twenty20 International, contested between Australia and New Zealand in February 2005.

A five-wicket haul (also known as a "five-for" or "fifer") refers to a bowler taking five or more wickets in a single innings. This is regarded as a notable achievement, especially in the Twenty20 format, as bowlers can bowl no more than four overs in an innings. The first five-wicket haul in a WT20I match was taken by New Zealand's Amy Satterthwaite against England in August 2007. Satterthwaite took six wickets for 17 runs, the first six-wicket haul in the international format. On 26 August 2021, Netherlands' Frederique Overdijk became the first player to take seven wickets in an international Twenty-20 match when she took seven wickets for 3 runs against France  during the 2021 ICC Women's T20 World Cup Europe Qualifier in Spain. At the same time it became the best bowling figures in an innings surpassing Nepal's Anjali Chand who returned figures of 6 for 0 against the Maldives during the 2019 South Asian Games in Nepal. Tanzania's Nasra Saidi also conceded no runs in her five-wicket haul against Mali during the 2019 Kwibuka Women's T20 Tournament in Rwanda making both figures the most economical with an economy rate of zero. Shabnim Ismail of South Africa took the least economical five-wicket haul, bowling with an economy rate of 7.82 against India in February 2018. At 40 years of age, Chamani Seneviratne playing for the United Arab Emirates is the oldest player to take five wickets in an innings while Botsogo Mpedi of Botswana who returned figures of 6 for 8 against Lesotho during the Botswana 7s tournament in Gaborone in August 2018, is the youngest at 15. Mpedi alongside Chand and Indonesia's Ni Suwandewi are the only bowlers to take a five-wicket haul on W20I debut. Chand, Hong Kong's Kary Chan, Anisa Mohammed of the West Indies and Nomvelo Sibanda of Zimbabwe all took a hat-trick as part of their T20I five-wicket haul. There have been only five occurrences which did not result in a victory to the team taking the five-wicket haul.

, 71 five-wicket hauls have been taken by 65 different players, from 36 national teams, from more than 1,350 WT20I matches. Mohammed is the only bowler to have achieved the feat on three occasions.

Key

Five-wicket hauls

Notes

References

Women's Twenty20 International
!
Five-wicket hauls